Deep Web: The Untold Story of Bitcoin and the Silk Road is a 2015 documentary-film directed by Alex Winter, chronicling events surrounding Silk Road, bitcoin and politics of the dark web.

Covering the trial of Ross Ulbricht, the documentary features interviews with Wired writer Andy Greenberg and developer Amir Taaki. Deep Web features narration from actor Keanu Reeves. The film premiered at the 2015 South By Southwest film festival, and aired on the Epix network on May 31, 2015.

See also
 Darknet market
 Ross Ulbricht
 Silk Road

References

External links
 
 
 

2015 documentary films
2015 films
American documentary films
Bitcoin
Dark web
Darknet markets
Documentary films about the Internet
Documentary films about crime in the United States
Films about cryptocurrencies
Films directed by Alex Winter
Films produced by Alex Winter
Films with screenplays by Alex Winter
2010s English-language films
2010s American films